Lieutenant William Henry Brown was a Canadian World War I flying ace credited with nine aerial victories.

Early life
William Henry Brown was born in Victoria, British Columbia, Canada on 12 March 1894. He joined the 1st Canadian Signal Corps of the Canadian Expeditionary Force to serve in World War I. After two years with Signals, he transferred to the Royal Flying Corps in early 1917.

World War I
By August 1917, Brown was posted to 84 Squadron as a fighter pilot. He scored his first aerial victory with them on 26 November 1917, and would continue to score with them until 3 April 1918. Five days later, he was transferred off combat duty and returned to Home Establishment in England. He won a Military Cross for his valour. As the award citation makes clear, his bravery in dogfights was not the only reason for his medal; ground attacks against enemy troops were also prized.

Brown's Military Cross was gazetted on 22 June 1918:

Post World War I
Although Brown survived the war, his subsequent life is a mystery until his death on 28 February 1969 in Steilacoom, Washington, USA.

List of aerial victories

Endnotes

References
 

1894 births
1969 deaths
Canadian World War I flying aces
Canadian Expeditionary Force officers
Canadian recipients of the Military Cross
People from Victoria, British Columbia
Royal Flying Corps officers